"I Wanna Stay Home" is a song by the American power pop group Jellyfish. It is the fifth and final single released in support of their 1990 debut album Bellybutton.

Formats and track listing 
European 7" single (CUSS 4)
"I Wanna Stay Home" – 4:06
"Jet" (live) – 3:22

European CD single (CUSDG 4)
"I Wanna Stay Home" – 4:05
"Jet" (live) – 3:09
"Now She Knows She's Wrong" (live) – 2:45

Charts

References

External links 
 

1990 songs
1991 singles
Jellyfish (band) songs
Charisma Records singles
Song recordings produced by Jack Joseph Puig
Song recordings produced by Albhy Galuten
Songs written by Andy Sturmer